Lautimuia Afoa Uelese Vaʻai (born ) is a Samoan politician and Member of the Legislative Assembly of Samoa. He is a member of the FAST Party. He is a nephew of former Prime Minister Vaʻai Kolone.

Lautimuia is from the villages of Magiagi and Vaisala and trained as an accountant at the University of the South Pacific in Fiji and Auckland University of Technology in New Zealand. He worked as a lecturer at the National University of Samoa and as a senior civil servant before being appointed chief executive of the Samoa Shipping Corporation in November 2017. 

He contested the 2016 Samoan general election in the Vaimauga West 1 Constituency as a candidate for the Human Rights Protection Party.

In February 2023 he was selected as the FAST Party candidate for the 2023 Vaimauga 3 by-election. He won the by-election, defeating his HRPP rival by 400 votes in the preliminary count. He was sworn in as an MP on 7 March 2023.

References

Living people
Year of birth missing (living people)
People from Vaisigano
University of the South Pacific alumni
Auckland University of Technology alumni
Academic staff of the National University of Samoa
Samoan civil servants
Members of the Legislative Assembly of Samoa
Faʻatuatua i le Atua Samoa ua Tasi politicians